Sherwood  Co-operative Association Limited (commonly referred to as Sherwood Co-op) is a retail cooperative operating in Regina, Saskatchewan, Canada.

Present Operations
Sherwood Co-op is a locally-owned and operated retail co-operative that was incorporated on April 8, 1931. Sherwood Co-op has over 67,000 Member/owners, over 650 employees, assets of in excess of $136 million and annual sales over $230 million. Sherwood Co-op supports over 500 charities and non-profit organizations annually. 

With three Food Centres, a Home and Building Centre, ten Gas Bar/Convenience Store/Car Washes, and 1 stand alone Pharmacy, Sherwood Co-op has become one of the largest retail businesses in the City of Regina.  In addition, Sherwood Co-op operates branch locations in Emerald Park, Indian Head, Southey, Dysart and Montmartre.

Sherwood Co-op is Locally Invested, very Community Minded and offers Lifetime Membership Benefits.

Sherwood Co-op is a member of Federated Co-operatives.

See also
List of Co-operative Federations
List of Canadian supermarkets

References

External links
Official Website

Companies based in Regina, Saskatchewan
Consumers' co-operatives of Canada